Solidify is the third album by heavy metal band Grip Inc.

Track listing

Line-up 

 Dave Lombardo — drums, percussion
 Gus Chambers — vocals
 Stuart Carruthers — bass
 Waldemar Sorychta — guitars, keyboards

References

1999 albums
Grip Inc. albums
SPV/Steamhammer albums
Albums produced by Waldemar Sorychta